The 1920–21 Scottish Districts season is a record of all the rugby union matches for Scotland's district teams.

History

Edinburgh District beat Glasgow District in the Inter-City match.

North v Midlands 17 November 1920.

Cities v Rest 11 Dec 1920.

Probables v Possibles 8 Jan 1921.

Results

Inter-City

Glasgow District:

Edinburgh District:

Other Scottish matches

Provinces District:

Cities District: 

Provinces District:

Anglo-Scots:

Trial matches

Scotland Probables:

Scotland Possibles:

English matches

No other District matches played.

International matches

No touring matches this season.

References

1920–21 in Scottish rugby union
Scottish Districts seasons